Cornelia Otis Skinner (May 30, 1899 – July 9, 1979) was an American writer and actress.

Biography
Skinner was the only child of actor Otis Skinner and actress Maud Durbin. After attending the all-girls' Baldwin School and Bryn Mawr College (1918–1919), and studying theatre at the Sorbonne in Paris, she began her career on the stage in 1921. 

Skinner appeared in several plays before embarking on a tour of the United States from 1926 to 1929 in a one-woman performance of short character sketches which she had written. She also wrote numerous short, humorous pieces for publications such as The New Yorker. These pieces were eventually compiled into a series of books, including Nuts in May, Dithers and Jitters, Excuse It Please!, and The Ape in Me, among others.

In a "comprehensive study" of Skinner's work, G. Bruce Loganbill (1961) refers to Skinner's scripts as "monologue-dramas," which were extensions of the "linked monologues" developed by Ruth Draper. Skinner's work differed in structure and content, however, as she created and performed full-length monologue-dramas that were based on the lives of historical figures. Such work was described as a "unique" and important contribution to the one-person show in America.

She appeared with Orson Welles on The Campbell Playhouse radio play of "American Cavalcade: The Things We Have" on May 26, 1939.

With Emily Kimbrough, Skinner wrote Our Hearts Were Young and Gay, a light-hearted description of their European tour after college. Kimbrough and Skinner went to Hollywood to act as consultants on the film adaptation of the book, produced as a film of the same name, with Gail Russell playing Skinner. The book was also adapted as a 1950 television series The Girls, in which Skinner was portrayed by Bethel Leslie (replaced by Gloria Stroock).

In 1952, Skinner's one-woman show Paris '90 (music and lyrics by Kay Swift) premiered on Broadway. An original cast recording was produced by Goddard Lieberson for Columbia Records, and is now available on compact disc. In later years Skinner wrote Madame Sarah (a biography of Sarah Bernhardt), and Elegant Wits and Grand Horizontals about the Belle Epoque.

In a 1944 conversation with Victor Borge, Skinner reportedly told the Danish comedian that she decided to drop the term "diseuse" from her act after reading in a Scottish newspaper: "Cornelia Otis Skinner, the American disease, gave a program last night."

Marriage
Cornelia Otis Skinner married Alden Sanford Blodget on October 5, 1928 in Warm Springs, Virginia. On August 28, 1930, she gave birth to her only child, a son, Otis Skinner Blodget, who died on March 11, 2007, aged 76.

Filmography

As an actress
 The Uninvited (1943) - Miss Holloway
 General Electric Guest House (1951, episode dated July 1, 1951)
 Paris '90 (1952)
 The Girl in the Red Velvet Swing (1955) - Mrs. Thaw
 Max Liebman Presents: Dearest Enemy (1955, TV Episode) - Mrs. Murray
 The Alcoa Hour (1956, Episode: "Merry Christmas, Mr. Baxter") - Susan Baxter
 The Swimmer (1968) - Mrs. Hammar

As herself
 Stage Door Canteen (1943)
 Toast of the Town (later The Ed Sullivan Show) TV episodes #4.7 (1950),  #4.14 (1950), #5.32 (1952), and #7.8 (1953)
 Faye Emerson's Wonderful Town (1951), TV episode dated June 23, 1951
 What's It For? (1957) TV episode dated October 12, 1957
 What's My Line? (1959) TV episode dated March 29, 1959
 This Is Your Life (1959) Charlie Ruggles (TV episode)

Bibliography

Non-fiction

 

Memoirs
 Our Hearts Were Young and Gay (with Emily Kimbrough, 1942; Dodd, Mead and Company Inc.)
 Family Circle (1948) – an autobiographical work (entitled Happy Family in the UK)
  Humorous autobiographical piece.
Biographies
 Madame Sarah (1967) – a biography of Sarah Bernhardt.
 Life with Lindsay and Crouse (1976) – a biography of Howard Lindsay and Russel Crouse.
Essay compilations
 Tiny Garments (1932)
 Excuse It, Please! (1936)
 Dithers and Jitters (1937)
 Soap Behind the Ears (1941)
 Popcorn (1943)
 That's Me All Over (1948) – a collection of the best essays from the prior 4 compilations.
 Nuts in May (1950)
 Bottoms Up! (1955) Dodd, Mead, and Company, New York
 The Ape in Me (1959)

Playwriting, screenwriting, scriptwriting
 Edna, His Wife (1937), play based on the 1935 novel of the same name by Margaret Ayer Barnes
 The Girls (1950) TV series
 The Pleasure of His Company (1958) play (adapted as a film in 1961)

Monologues
 The Wives of Henry VIII (1931)
 The Empress Eugenie (1932)
 The Loves of Charles II (1933)
 The Mansion on the Hudson (1935)

Critical studies and reviews of Skinner's work
 Cast of One: One Person Shows from the Chautauqua Platform to the Broadway Stage (1989)- Section on Skinner

Sources

External links

Skinner Family Papers, 1874-1979 at Houghton Library, Harvard University
Cornelia Otis Skinner scrapbooks, 1921-1978, held by the Billy Rose Theatre Division, New York Public Library for the Performing Arts
 
 "American Cavalcade: The Things We Have" (May 26, 1939) on The Campbell Playhouse, with guest Cornelia Otis Skinner (Indiana University Bloomington)
"Annotations: The NEH Preservation Project" Two Skinner monologues from a 1951 Book and Author Luncheon

Further reading

Screenwriters from New York (state)
American film actresses
American stage actresses
American humorists
American travel writers
Bryn Mawr College alumni
The New Yorker people
Actresses from Chicago
Writers from Manhattan
1899 births
1979 deaths
American women screenwriters
American women travel writers
20th-century American actresses
American women dramatists and playwrights
Women humorists
The Baldwin School alumni
20th-century American dramatists and playwrights
20th-century American women writers
20th-century American non-fiction writers
Screenwriters from Illinois
20th-century American screenwriters
Members of The Lambs Club